Score a Score is a Los Angeles, CA-based music production, licensing and supervision company with additional offices in New York City, NY and Boston, MA. Founded in 2010 by CEO, Jordan Passman, Score a Score represents a roster of over 400 composers world-wide and has worked with brands like Microsoft, Google, Coca-Cola, Taco Bell, Verizon, Mastercard, Kia and Gap as well as film trailers for Disney, Sony, Universal, Paramount, Warner Brothers, Fox, Amazon, and Netflix. In 2020, Score a Score made Inc. Magazine's annual Inc. 5000 list of the fastest-growing privately held companies in the U.S. for their fifth consecutive year.

In the summer of 2017, Score a Score worked with Fitzco//Mccann on Coca-Cola's Share a Coke campaign to create over 1000 unique songs based on names printed on bottles of Coke. The project would go on to win multiple awards, including several from OneShow and two pencils from D&AD.

History
Jordan Passman launched Score a Score in 2010 out of his parents’ home in Beverly Hills. Originally created as a website to connect brands and composers, SAS landed their first big client when Lego anonymously posted a request seeking music. In 2014, Passman was selected by Forbes as one of their 30 under 30 in the music category. In 2017, Score a Score opened up their Boston office under the direction of COO, Jake Weinreb.

References 

Music production companies